Christophe Guy Denis "Christopher" Lambert (born March 29, 1957) is a French-American actor, producer, and novelist. He started his career playing supporting parts in several French films, and became internationally famous for portraying Tarzan in Greystoke: The Legend of Tarzan, Lord of the Apes (1984). For his performance in the film Subway (1985), he received the César Award for Best Actor. His most famous role is Connor MacLeod in the adventure-fantasy film Highlander (1986) and the subsequent franchise of the same name.

Lambert's other notable film roles include I Love You (1986), The Sicilian (1987), Knight Moves (1992), Fortress (1992) and its sequel Fortress 2: Re-Entry (2000), Mortal Kombat (1995), Druids (2001), Absolon (2003), White Material (2009), Ghost Rider: Spirit of Vengeance (2011), and Kickboxer: Retaliation (2018). He also produced the films Don't Forget You're Going to Die (1995), Neuf mois (1994), and its English-language remake Nine Months (1995).

Early life
Christophe Guy Denis Lambert   was born in Great Neck, New York, on March 29, 1957, the son of Yolande Agnès Henriette (née de Caritat de Peruzzis; born 1928), and Georges Lambert-Lamond (1910–2003). a French diplomat at the United Nations. His father was Jewish. Due to his father's work, Lambert moved with his parents to Switzerland at the age of two, and was raised in Geneva and went to institute Florimont until his teenage years, when the family moved to France and settled in Paris. Lambert's debut in acting was in a school play age 12.

Career

1979–1984
Lambert started his career playing supporting parts in several French films such as Ciao, les mecs (bye, you guys) (1979), Le bar du téléphone (1980), Asphalte (1981), Une sale affaire (1981), Putain d'histoire d'amour (1981), Douchka (1981), Légitime violence (1982), and Paroles et musique (Love Songs) in 1984.

In 1984, director Hugh Hudson and Warner Brothers, sought out Lambert, wanting an unknown actor to play Tarzan, a human raised by apes in the jungle. Lambert got the role partly due to his myopia, because when he took off his glasses it seemed he was always looking into the distance. Released in 1984, Greystoke: The Legend of Tarzan, Lord of the Apes, was nominated for many awards.

1985–2000
In 1985, Lambert played the lead in Luc Besson's stylistic film Subway, about a man being hunted in the underground subways of Paris. 

In 1986, Russell Mulcahy's Highlander premiered. In the film, Lambert starred as Connor MacLeod, an immortal warrior who could only be killed by decapitation. The film became a cult hit and was an international box-office success, rock group Queen composed and performed the soundtrack, and Lambert also appeared as MacLeod in the music video for Queen's "Princes of the Universe". Also that year, Lambert took the leading role in Marco Ferreri's I Love You, which was nominated for the Palme d'Or at the Cannes Film Festival, and the Silver Ribbon at the Italian National Syndicate of Film Journalists.

In 1987, Lambert played the leading role of Salvatore Giuliano in The Sicilian, directed by Michael Cimino, based on the Mario Puzo book of the same name. In 1988, he starred in Agnieszka Holland's To Kill a Priest, in which he played a character based on Jerzy Popiełuszko and his murder under the Polish communist regime. That year, he also played the lead in the romantic film Priceless Beauty with actress Diane Lane. They got married the same year, their union lasting until 1994.

In 1990, he did the comedy Why Me?, co-starring Christopher Lloyd, with them both playing burglars who get into trouble after stealing a sacred ruby from Turkey.

On November 1, 1991, the Highlander sequel, Highlander II: The Quickening premiered, reuniting Lambert with director Russell Mulcahy and fellow actor Sean Connery. Shot in Argentina to reduce production costs; which was going through a financial crisis, much of the script was not filmed and the final result was a patchwork. It was said, Lambert threatened to walk out of the project when it was nearing fruition, However, due to contractual obligations, he did reconsidered. That same year he got his first producer credit in the French film Génial, mes parents divorcent by Patrick Braoudé.

In 1992, he appeared in three projects. He appeared in the first episode of the television show Highlander: The Series, passing on the lead role to actor Adrian Paul. He also appeared in the French crime thriller Max et Jérémie, co-starring Philippe Noiret and Jean-Pierre Marielle.

In January 1993, Carl Schenkel's suspense thriller Knight Moves premiered, in which Lambert was both an executive producer and the lead. Lambert plays a chess grandmaster suspected of murder. Later that year, Stuart Gordon's science fiction film Fortress premiered, with Lambert playing the lead. The story takes place in a dystopian future where a man and his wife are sent to a maximum-security prison because they are expecting a second child, which is against the strict one-child policy. The film was a success at the box-office. That year, he also made an uncredited cameo in the comedy Loaded Weapon 1.

1994 saw the release of two collaborations with actor Mario Van Peebles. They played the side by side leads in the action film Gunmen, and Van Peebles was the main villain in Highlander III: The Sorcerer. In this third installment of the franchise, Connor MacLeod is forced to face a new, dangerous enemy, a powerful sorcerer known as Kane who wants to gain world domination. Lambert also starred in the action film Roadflower. In France, he produced his second Patrick Braoudé film called Neuf mois, which was nominated for two Césars.

In 1995, he played the role of the thunder god Raiden in the Paul W. S. Anderson's movie adaptation of the popular video game series Mortal Kombat. The plot of the film follows the warrior monk Liu Kang, the actor Johnny Cage, and the soldier Sonya Blade, all three guided by the god Raiden, on their journey to combat the evil sorcerer Shang Tsung and his forces in a tournament to save Earth. Lambert later reprised the role in the MK Movie Skin Pack in the 2020 game Mortal Kombat 11. In 1995, he also starred in the American-Japanese martial arts action film The Hunted, directed by J. F. Lawton, with a cast that included John Lone, Joan Chen, Yoshio Harada, and Yoko Shimada. Also in 1995, he produced Xavier Beauvois's Don't Forget You're Going to Die, which won the Special Jury Award at the Gijón International Film Festival, won the Prix Jean Vigo, won the Jury Prize and was nominated for the Palme d'Or at the Cannes Film Festival. Lambert was also an executive producer on Chris Columbus' Nine Months, an English-language remake of Neuf mois.

In 1996, Lambert was an executive producer and the lead in Nils Gaup's western film North Star, co-starring James Caan. He played Lemieux, the lead role in the action film Adrenalin: Fear the Rush. and played Vincent in the French film Hercule et Sherlock. The same year he was a producer of When Saturday Comes, a football sport drama starring Sean Bean.

In 1997, he starred in Gabriele Salvatores' cyberpunk science fiction film Nirvana. The film tells the story of a virtual reality game designer, played by Lambert, who discovers that the main character of his game has achieved sentience due to an attack by a computer virus. The film was screened out of competition at the Cannes Film Festival. The same year, he also co-lead with Ice-T in the action film Mean Guns, and starred in the French film Arlette by Claude Zidi. 

In 1998, he produced and starred in Operation Splitsville was a remake of Génial, mes parents divorcent, which he produced several years earlier. The same year produced and played a man with a mental disability, who moveg into a nursing home, in the film Gideon.

In 1999, he produced and starred in Russell Mulcahy's Resurrection, where he plays a detective who is assigned to investigate the savage murder of a man who has bled to death from a severed arm. He also starred in science fantasy-action film Beowulf. 

In 2000, he played in the fourth installment of the Highlander franchise, Highlander: Endgame. The film reunited him with Adrian Paul, and would be last sequel Lambert appeared in. The same year, he was still on the run from authorities in the sequel Fortress 2: Re-Entry.

2001–2010

In 2001, he played the lead role of Gallic chieftain Vercingetorix in the France-Canada production Druids. He also starred in John Glen's The Point Men, about a team of Israeli agents being killed off one-by-one after a botched anti-terrorist operation. He also provided his voice for the English dub of the animated series Mazinkaiser.

In 2002, he was an executive producer and a co-lead in the thriller The Piano Player, with Dennis Hopper. He also provided his voice for the English dub of the animated series Jing: King of Bandits.

In 2003, he played in Absolon, a post-apocalyptic science fiction thriller film. He also played a supporting role in the French film Janis and John. He also acted in the short film Qui veut la peau de Roberto Santini?.

In 2004, he acted opposite Nastassja Kinski in the French film À ton image. He also played in one episode of Cirque du Soleil: Solstrom. He was an executive producer on the film The Confessor starring Christian Slater, Molly Parker, and Stephen Rea. The film follows a straying Catholic priest, played by Slater, who investigates a troubled teen's mysterious death. It was nominated for two awards at the Directors Guild of Canada.

In 2005, he acted in the television film biopic Dalida.

In 2006, he was an executive producer and star on the film Day of Wrath. He starred in the French film Le Lièvre de Vatanen. He also played a supporting role in Richard Kelly's Southland Tales.

In 2007, he starred in the vampire film Metamorphosis. He starred in the French film Trivial, directed by Sophie Marceau. It is about a police inspector struggling with depression following his wife's death who investigates a suspicious missing person's case at the request of a mysterious woman. During that time, he started a relationship with Marceau.

In 2008, he played in the French crime thriller Limousine. In 2009, Lambert was a lead in Claire Denis' White Material; both the film and Lambert's performance received critical acclaim. The film stars Isabelle Huppert as a struggling French coffee producer in an unnamed French speaking African country, who decides to stay at her coffee plantation in spite of an erupting civil war. The film has appeared on a number of critics' top ten lists of the best films of 2010. It was nominated at the Denver Film Critics Society Award for Best Foreign Language Film, for a Golden Lion, a Satellite Award for Best Foreign Language Film, at the Washington DC Area Film Critics Association, etc.

That year, he also acted in Cartagena, with Sophie Marceau starring as a beautiful, free-spirited woman who becomes bedridden following a terrible accident. Against her better judgement, she hires a drunk middle-aged former boxer (Lambert) to cook and care for her. Although unqualified for the position, he is desperate for work, and slowly he wins the trust of the woman, who teaches him how to read. The film also won several awards in France.

In 2010, he played in Philipp Kadelbach's Das Geheimnis der Wale. The film is about the widow of a whale researcher who joins forces with an environmentalist played by Lambert to fight an oil company. That year he also played the lead in The Gardener of God, a biopic about Gregor Mendel.

2011–present

In 2011, Lambert starred as the villainous head monk Methodius in the Ghost Rider sequel Ghost Rider: Spirit of Vengeance, starring Nicolas Cage, in 2011. He underwent sword training for three months and shaved his head. The film made $132.6 million worldwide.

In 2012, he played a role in the Bulgarian film The Foreigner, and the Italian film L'una e l'altra. In France, he also played a lead role in the film called Ma bonne étoile opposite Claude Brasseur, and Fleur Lise Heuet, and one episode of the TV show Very Bad Blagues.

Shortly afterwards, he got the role of Marcel Janvier (alias "The Chameleon"), a recurring villain in award-winning hit police crime TV drama NCIS: Los Angeles. His character was in six episodes from 2012 to 2013 – the two highest-rated seasons of the show.

In 2013, he was one of the cast members in the horror film Blood Shot. He also acted in the French TV series La source.

In 2014, he played in the biographical crime drama film Electric Slide, about the Los Angeles-based bank robber Eddie Dodson.

In 2015, he co-starred in Claude Lelouch's Un plus une, a French romantic comedy film. He also co-starred in the biographical film 10 Days in a Madhouse, about the experiences of undercover journalist Nellie Bly.

In 2016 he co-starred in Hail, Caesar!, a comedy film written, produced, edited, and directed by Joel and Ethan Coen. It is a fictional story that follows the real-life "fixer" Eddie Mannix (Josh Brolin) working in the Hollywood film industry in the 1950s, trying to discover what happened to a cast member who vanished during the filming of a biblical epic.

That year, he cameoed as a French Army Captain in La folle histoire de Max et Léon, a French World War II comedy film. He also had a recurring role in the Russian-Portuguese biographical television show Mata Hari.

In 2017 he re-collaborated with Claude Lelouch in the star studded comedy Chacun sa vie et son intime conviction. He also acted in the thriller The Broken Key with Rutger Hauer, Michael Madsen, Geraldine Chaplin, Franco Nero and William Baldwin. He also played himself in one episode of the French TV show Call My Agent!.

That year, he also played the lead villain in the martial arts film Kickboxer: Retaliation.

Lambert plays the role of SS officer Karl Frenzel in the Russian film Sobibor by director Konstantin Khabensky, which was released in 2018. The film is a World War II drama about the only successful uprising in a Nazi death camp. It was selected as the Russian entry for the Best Foreign Language Film at the 91st Academy Awards. Lambert received high praise for "an outstanding and nuanced performance; he is unrecognisable as Frenzel, a demonic, fractured character.

Lambert was part of the ensemble cast of Bel Canto from director Paul Weitz, an adaptation of the 2002 novel of the same name, by Ann Patchett. Lambert played the role of a French ambassador who was part of the Japanese embassy hostage crisis (also called the Lima Crisis) of 1996–1997 in Lima, Peru. Lambert received praise, along with the rest of the cast, for "performances [that] are uniformly excellent".

Other ventures 
Lambert has written two novels: La fille porte-bonheur in 2011 and Le juge in 2015.

Along with owning a mineral water business and food processing plant, Lambert produces Côtes du Rhône wines with his business partner Eric Beaumard at a vineyard in Sainte-Cécile-les-Vignes. The label, Les Garrigues de Beaumard-Lambert, tops out at 4,000 cases and is sold mostly in Europe. Beaumard has primary creative control of the winery, but Lambert conducts barrel tests and monitors the various stages of the wine's evolution.

Personal life
Lambert was married to American actress Diane Lane from 1988 until their divorce in 1994. Their daughter, Eleanor Jasmine, was born in 1993. Lambert married American actress Jaimyse Haft in 1999, and they divorced in 2000. From 2007 to 2014, he dated French actress Sophie Marceau.

Lambert has profound myopia and cannot see without his glasses. He cannot wear contact lenses and often has to perform while virtually blind, which has led to injuries while performing his own stunts.

Filmography

Video games

References

External links

1957 births
20th-century French male actors
21st-century French male actors
Cours Florent alumni
American film producers
American male film actors
American male television actors
American people of French-Jewish descent
Best Actor César Award winners
French film producers
French male film actors
French male television actors
French people of Jewish descent
Living people
Actors from Paris